The VDL SB200 (originally the DAF SB200) is a light-weight 12m low floor single decker bus chassis that was produced from 2001 to 2014 by VDL Bus & Coach (formerly DAF Bus International). It superseded the SB220.

It is originally designed for use by Arriva (VDL dealer in the United Kingdom) in order to save fuel over heavy-weight citybuses which are designed for Continental Europe where buses carry large numbers of standing passengers, whereas in the UK they do not.

The SB200 sold very well in VDL's home market, the Netherlands mainly using VDL Berkhof type Ambassador and VDL Citea LLE bodywork. They were operated by all large transport companies in the Netherlands, Connexxion (including Hermes), Veolia Transport and Arriva. Arriva also used SB200s with Wright Commander bodywork.

Of the 831 built for United Kingdom operators, Arriva purchased 704, Tellings-Golden Miller 30 and John Fishwick & Sons 23.

Initially the SB200 built for the UK was only available with Wright Commander bodywork, but from 2006 it was available with the Plaxton Centro or Wright Pulsar bodywork, the latter being succeeded in late 2009 by the facelifted Wright Pulsar 2.

One VDL SB200 was fitted with an MCV Evolution body in 2012 as a static demonstrator for Arriva Bus & Coach, it was sold in 2014 to Richards Brothers in Wales.

References

External links

SB 200 product guide VDL Bus & Coach

Bus chassis
Low-floor buses
SB200
Vehicles introduced in 2001